Simhadriya Simha is a 2002 Indian Kannada-language action drama film directed by S. Narayan. The film stars Vishnuvardhan, Meena and Bhanupriya. The music of the film was composed by Deva. The film was a remake of the 1994 Tamil film Nattamai.

Vishnuvardhan played triple role in this movie.

Cast

 Vishnuvardhan as Jr.Gowdru, Chikka and Narasimha Gowdru
 Meena as Deepa, Chikka's wife (voice dubbed by Sudharani )
 Bhanupriya as Lakshmi
 Shivaram
 M. S. Umesh
 Shobhraj
 Abhijeeth
 Umashri
 Mukhyamantri Chandru
 Sundar Raj
 Keertiraj
 Ruchita Prasad
 Rekha Das 
 Vijay Kumar as Bhanupriya's Brother

Story
The story revolves around Narasimhe Gowda (Vishnuvardhan), who is the chieftain for a group of 48 villages. He is the man with the strength of an elephant and who rules the Simhadri village as a lion rules his kingdom. The sincerity and the wisdom in the judgement makes the people go to Narasimha for justice and not the police. one of the relative of Narasimha Gowda Shobraj, rapes a girl and is banished from the village for 18 years. He also has to marry the girl according to the judgement by the Gowda. Such a harsh judgement makes Shobraj's father kill Narasimhe Gowda. The throne is ascended by the elder son of Narasimha Gowda, who is also portrayed by Vishnuvardhan as a just and powerful ruler. Things take a turn after 18 years when the Simhadriya Simha family has to undergo a similar situation. Due to a twist of fate, Gowda has to decide his brother Chikka's (again played by Vishnuvardhan) fate. The judgement - Chikka is ordered to leave the village for 10 years. Truth is unveiled when Shobraj's mother reveals the involvement of her son in falsely implicating Chikka. The stage is then set for a perfect climax.

Reception
All the reviews for the movie were positive. Vishnuvardhan's acting was the highlight of the film and had got great reviews everywhere.

The film became a huge hit in all the parts of Karnataka and completed 25 successful weeks in the theaters. It created craze among the audience and songs like Malnad Adike, Priya Priya and Simhaadriya Simha, all sung by S. P. Balasubrahmanyam were huge hits and were regularly played at functions, shows etc.

Soundtrack
The film's soundtrack was composed by Deva with lyrics penned by the director S. Narayan himself. The song "Kotha Paakum" from the original Tamil film Nattamai was retained here as "Malnad Adike". Deva later reused "Kalladare Naanu" as "Poove Mudhal" in Tamil film Kadhal Kirukkan.

References

External links
 

2002 films
2000s Kannada-language films
Kannada remakes of Tamil films
Films scored by Deva (composer)
Films directed by S. Narayan